Jenny Alm (born 10 April 1989) is a Swedish handball player for København Håndbold. and a retired player for the Swedish national team.

She participated at the 2011 World Women's Handball Championship in Brazil.

References

External links

1989 births
Living people
Swedish female handball players
Expatriate handball players
Swedish expatriate sportspeople in Denmark
People from Uddevalla Municipality
Handball players at the 2016 Summer Olympics
Olympic handball players of Sweden
IK Sävehof players
Sportspeople from Västra Götaland County
21st-century Swedish women